The Coffin is a 2008 horror film starring Ananda Everingham and Karen Mok.

Plot
A young man named Chris (Ananda Everingham), and several years later, a woman named Zoe (Karen Mok), undergo a Thai ritual of lying in a coffin, which is supposed to ensure long life and banish bad luck. The ritual is also seen as a solution to diseases like liver cancer.  
The movie is not continuous as it shows scenes of the past and the present. 
Chris wakes and is brought to the hospital where doctors say he suffers from hallucinations. Chris has a current girlfriend whom he wants to marry. However, the  ex-girlfriend tries to kill the current girlfriend. 
The woman on the other hand is rid of her lung cancer, however is haunted by her boyfriend, Jack, whom she was supposed to marry.  The woman consults an expert in the paranormal, and later Chris, to try to solve her supernatural difficulties.

Cast
Ananda Everingham – Chris
Karen Mok – Zoe
Aki Shibuya – Mariko (Chris's girlfriend)
Andrew Lin – Zoe's fiancé Jack
Florence Faivre – Zoe's friend
Michael Pupart – Professor Thanachai
Napakpapha Nakprasitte

External links 
 
 

Thai-language films
Thai horror films
Hong Kong horror films
2008 films
South Korean horror films
Hong Kong multilingual films
Thai multilingual films
2000s English-language films
2000s South Korean films
2000s Hong Kong films